Benjamin Maurice Silverstone (born 9 April 1979) is an English barrister and former actor. Silverstone's appeared in the 1998 Paramount Classics feature film, Get Real.

Early life and education
Silverstone was born in Camden, London, the son of Beverly and Anthony Silverstone. He has one sister and one brother. He studied English at Trinity College, Cambridge, and law (LLM) at the London School of Economics.

Career 
Prior to Get Real, Silverstone appeared in Adrian Lyne's adaptation of Lolita in 1997 and Mike Figgis' The Browning Version in 1994.
Get Real was based on Patrick Wilde's stage play What's Wrong with Angry?, and is a love story between two British schoolboys. Silverstone made the front cover of Gay Times in May 1999 to mark the release of the film.

The film achieved cult status with many fans, and even gave rise to two fan-organised gatherings in the filming locations around Basingstoke. The events in themselves attracted the attention of the television media, as fans of the film travelled several thousand miles to the event.

Immediately after the release of Get Real, Silverstone went to Cambridge University. While there, he acted in student productions of King Lear, The Whiteheaded Boy, The Duchess of Malfi, The Resistible Rise of Arturo Ui, Near Miss and The Winter's Tale. Silverstone left Cambridge in 2001 with a first class degree.

Since 2001, Silverstone has appeared in numerous stage productions such as The Tempest and My Boy Jack and was nominated for both a The Times Theatre Award and an Evening Standard Theatre Award for his portrayal of Basil Anthony in the West End production of Man and Boy

His most recent film project is Jump! (2007), in which he starred as a young Jewish photographer charged with the murder of his father, based on the real-life story of Philippe Halsman, opposite Patrick Swayze and Martine McCutcheon.

As a lawyer, Silverstone works at Matrix Chambers.

Selected credits

Theatre
 The Age of Consent (Timmy), Edinburgh Fringe (2001)
 The Age of Consent (Timmy), Bush Theatre, London (2002)
 The Lady's Not For Burning (Richard), Chichester Festival Theatre (2002)
 The Tempest (Ariel), UK Tour (2002)
 Electra (Orestes), The Gate Theatre, London (2003)
 My Boy Jack (Jack Kipling), UK Tour (2004)
 Man and Boy (Basil Anthony), UK Tour (2004)
 Man and Boy (Basil Anthony), Duchess Theatre, London (2005)

Film
 The Browning Version (Taplow), dir. Mike Figgis (1994)
 Lolita (Young Humbert), dir. Adrian Lyne (1997)
 Get Real (Steven Carter), dir. Simon Shore (1998)
 Jump! (Philippe Halsman), dir. Joshua Sinclair (2007)

Television
 Shackleton (Young Applicant), Channel 4 (2001)
 Timewatch: Through Hell for Hitler (Henry Metalmann), BBC2 (2003)
 Doctors (Joe Nyland), BBC1 (2003)

Radio
 Phobos (Drew), BBC 7 (2007)

References

External links
 
 BenSilverstone.net
 Profile at Matrix Chambers

1979 births
20th-century English male actors
21st-century English male actors
Alumni of the London School of Economics
Alumni of Trinity College, Cambridge
English barristers
English male child actors
English male film actors
English male radio actors
English male stage actors
English male television actors
Living people
Male actors from London
People from the London Borough of Camden